Derbydown Homestead, also known as the Abraham Marshall House and Birthplace of Humphry Marshall, is a historic home located in West Bradford Township, Chester County, Pennsylvania. The original house was built in 1707, as a one-room, three bay, -story stone structure.  It was later enlarged to have a gabrel roof.  In 1764, it was enlarged again to  stories with stone and brick construction, and the roof modified to a gable roof with pent eve.  Also on the property is a large barn with a gambrel roof.  It was first owned by Abraham Marshall, founder of the Bradford Friends Meetinghouse, which met in the house from 1722 to 1727.  Marshall was the father of botanist Humphry Marshall, who was born at the house in 1722.

It was added to the National Register of Historic Places in 1973.

References

Houses on the National Register of Historic Places in Pennsylvania
Houses completed in 1707
Houses in Chester County, Pennsylvania
National Register of Historic Places in Chester County, Pennsylvania
1707 establishments in Pennsylvania